Nelle Lee is a Brisbane-based actress, producer and writer best known for theatre work.

She is also artistic director of independent theatre company, Shake and Stir.

Career 
She studied at the University of Southern Queensland, and graduated in 2004 with a BTA acting. She was also awarded the 2011 Young Alumnus of the Year Award and Faculty of Arts Prize in a special ceremony. She approached the Principal at Albany Creek (her old school) and launched an after-school drama class.

She then went on tour in Queensland and Victoria with "Newton's Law". After three seasons, Nelle went on to perform with a variety of theatre companies, including the Queensland Theatre Company, the Harvest Rain Theatre Company, The Forward Movement/Metro Arts Independence and Strut 'n' Fret/QLD Arts Council.

Nelle has also acted in several film and television productions in the Brisbane area, including All My Friends Are Leaving Brisbane and Jucy. Additionally, she has voiced animations, radio commercials and television commercials.

Nelle Lee also has a dance background and she has choreographed a number of cabaret and main stage shows.

She created "Statepeare" which incorporates material from various Shakespeare plays and incorporates up-to-date references. Not a Shakespeare play, rather a play about studying his works. It is aimed at high school students and tours for several months of the year. It was nominated for a Helpmann Award in 2012 for Best Presentation for Children. In 2011 she won a Groundling Award for Outstanding Contribution by an actress (Animal Farm) and again in 2012 she again won a Groundling Award for Outstanding Contribution by an actress (1984).

Shake and Stir 
In 2006, Lee joined with Ross Balbuziente and Nick Skubij to form theatre company Shake and Stir and each is an Artistic Director. The company's productions have been nominated for several Helpmann Awards, Matilda Awards and APACA’S Drover Award for Tour of the Year.  In addition to their major productions they run Master Classes, produce shows for Primary and High School audiences, and run workshops and classes for Primary and High School children.

Film and TV credits 
See IMDB
All My Friends Are Leaving Brisbane (2007)
Mortified (2007)
Leader of the Pack (short 2009)
Sea Patrol (TV Series two episodes 2009, 2010)
Jucy (2010)
Reef 'n' Beef (2012)
The Inbetweeners 2 (2014)
Talking Back at Thunder (2014)

Theatre credits 
The Kooky Christmas Counterfeit (2005)
The Works of William Shakespeare [By Chicks (2006)
Alice (2007) (Mouse, Dormouse, Oyster, and Haigha)
Magda's Fascination With Wax Cats (actor) (2008)
Maxine Mellor's Mystery Project (actor) (2009)
Statespeare (actor, creator) (2009; 2011) 
Property of the Clan (2010)
The Crucible (actor) (2009)
Animal Farm ( actor) (2011, 2013)
1984 (actor, adaptor) (2012; March–July 2014)
Out Damned Snot (actor) (2013)
Roald Dahl's Revolting Rhymes and Dirty Beasts (actor) (touring June–October 2015)
Dracula (actor, adaptor) (2015; touring March–September 2017)
Tequila Mockingbird  (actor, writer) (October 2016)
Wuthering Heights  (actor) (touring March–June 2016)
Roald Dahl's George's Marvellous Medicine (actor) (December 2016/January 2017)

References

External sources
 Official website Shake & Stir

Year of birth missing (living people)
Living people
Actresses from Brisbane